Rafflesia tengku-adlinii is a parasitic plant species of the genus Rafflesia. It was discovered on Mount Trus Madi in Sabah, Malaysia in 1987.

This species was named after the conservationist Datuk Dr. Tengku D. Z. Adlin.

References

tengku-adlinii
Endemic flora of Borneo
Flora of Sabah